Matthew Perry (born 1969) is a Canadian-American television and film actor.

Matthew Perry or Matt Perry may also refer to:

 Matthew C. Perry (1794–1858), American naval officer who forcibly opened Japan to trade with the West
 Matthew Perry Monument (Newport, Rhode Island)
 USNS Matthew Perry (T-AKE-9)
 Matthew J. Perry (1921–2011), South Carolina's first African-American US District Court judge
 Matt Perry (rugby union) (born 1977), English rugby union footballer

See also
 Matt Parry (born 1994), British racing driver
 Matthew Parry (cricketer) (1885–1931), Irish cricketer